Gulumbi is a payam in Morobo County, Central Equatoria State, South Sudan. The village and Payam headquarters is located along Yei - Kaya.

See also 
Panyume
Kimba Payam
Lujule
Aboroto
Kaya

References 

Central Equatoria